Nebojša Novaković (born 29 October 1964) is a former professional football player who played as a striker, most notably for AIK. He is the manager of Vasalunds IF. Born in Sarajevo, he moved to Sweden in the early 1990s.

Biography
He was born 29 October 1964, in Sarajevo, SR Bosnia and Herzegovina, Yugoslavia to Bosnian Serb parents. He started his youth career at FK Bratstvo Vojkovići. He supported Red Star Belgrade as a youngster. He moved from Sarajevo in 1991, a year before the war broke out, to Solna, a suburb of Stockholm. He is nicknamed Nešo and Nebo.

Playing career 
Novaković joined Vasalunds IF in 1991 and played 33 league matches (19 goals) for the team in the 1991 and 1992 season.

For the 1993 season, Novaković joined Djurgårdens IF and played 94 matches (46 goals) for the team between 1993 and 1997.

In AIK, he made 104 league appearances, scored 27 goals, won Allsvenskan in 1998 and played in the Champions League's 1999–2000 season. during which he scored a memorable lob versus FC Barcelona.

Coaching career
After his playing career he got the job as assistant manager in Väsby IK with Rikard Norling as manager. The club won the league two years in a row but didn't manage to win any of the promotion qualifications. After the 2003 season he returned to AIK to be assistant manager to Richard Money. Money later resigned from AIK and got replaced by Patrick Englund, who got sacked after the 2004 season. Novakovic followed AIK and the new manager Rikard Norling to Superettan in 2005 due to their regulation. AIK won Superettan and reached for second place in Allsvenskan 2006. In 2008 the club got the fifth place and were a disappointment to many supporters. Rikard Norling got sacked and Novakovic resigned because of it. A few months later Novakovic and AIK negotiated to get him a new role in the club but outside the training staff, but they didn't get an agreement. Novakovic said that he's a coach and will continue his career as one.

On January 10, 2009 he became assistant manager to Patrick Walker in the Norwegian Tippeligaen club Sandefjord Fotball.

On December 16, 2010 he returned to AIK and signed a 3-year contract with the club as assistant manager together with the new manager Andreas Alm.

Personal life

He is married to Gordana, with whom he has a son, Dejan (born 1990) and daughter, Daniella (born 1996). Daniella is also a footballer in AIK's youth teams.

Career statistics

Honours 

 Djurgårdens IF
 Division 1 Norra : 1994

 AIK
 Allsvenskan: 1998
 Svenska Cupen: 1996–97, 1998–99
Individual
 Swedish Goal of the Year: 1998

References

External links
 Nebojša Novaković at aikfotboll.se 
  
  

1964 births
Living people
Footballers from Sarajevo
Serbs of Bosnia and Herzegovina
Yugoslav emigrants to Sweden
Association football forwards
Yugoslav footballers
Bosnia and Herzegovina footballers
FK Famos Vojkovići players
FK Famos Hrasnica players
HNK Cibalia players
Vasalunds IF players
Djurgårdens IF Fotboll players
AIK Fotboll players
Väsby IK players
Yugoslav Second League players
Allsvenskan players
Yugoslav expatriate footballers
Bosnia and Herzegovina expatriate footballers
Expatriate footballers in Sweden
Yugoslav expatriate sportspeople in Sweden
Bosnia and Herzegovina expatriate sportspeople in Sweden
Bosnia and Herzegovina football managers
AIK Fotboll non-playing staff
Vasalunds IF managers